The Final Countdown Tour 1986 is a live album by the Swedish hard rock band Europe. It was released on December 20, 2004.

Track listing
 "The Final Countdown" (Joey Tempest)
 "Ninja" (Joey Tempest)
 "Carrie" (Joey Tempest, Mic Michaeli)
 "On the Loose" (Joey Tempest)
 "Cherokee"  (Joey Tempest)
 "Time Has Come" (Joey Tempest)
 "Open Your Heart" (Joey Tempest)
 "Stormwind" (Joey Tempest)
 "Rock the Night" (Joey Tempest)

Personnel
Joey Tempest – lead vocals, acoustic guitar
John Norum – lead & rhythm guitars, backing vocals
John Levén – bass guitar
Mic Michaeli – keyboards, backing vocals
Ian Haugland – drums, backing vocals

References 

Europe (band) albums
2004 live albums